Kirkland Lake District Composite School (commonly known as KLDCS), is a public elementary and secondary school located in Kirkland Lake, Ontario, Canada. It was established in 2006 to replace the building that housed both Kirkland Lake Collegiate and Vocational Institute and École secondaire catholique Jean Vanier.

See also
List of high schools in Ontario

References

External links 
 Ontario Ministry of Education listing of schools
 District School Board Ontario North East accouncement of new school 

Educational institutions established in 2006
High schools in Ontario
Kirkland Lake
Schools in Timiskaming District
2006 establishments in Canada